The Hanriot HD.32 was a military trainer aircraft built in France in the 1920s. Derived from the HD.14 and sharing the same basic configuration as it, the HD.32 was a substantially revised design, with redesigned tailplane, undercarriage, and wings of shorter span. The HD.14's wooden construction was replaced in part with metal structure.

The HD.32 was Hanriot's entry in a 1924 Aéronautique Militaire competition to select a new trainer, and as the winner, was ordered in quantity as the HD.32 EP.2. The type HD.320 was also built in Yugoslavia by Zmaj aircraft in Zemun,  using a Salmson 9Ac, Siemens Sh12 or Walter NZ-120, engine.

In 1927, the Paraguayan Military Aviation School received three HD.32 that were intensively used as primary trainers. They received the serials E.1, E.2 and E.3 (E meaning Escuela, School). They were replaced by five Consolidated Fleet 2 in 1931 and withdrawn from use in late 1932.

Operators
 
 French Air Force
 
 Air Force of El Salvador
 
 One aircraft only.
 
 Paraguayan Air Force - Three aircraft purchased in 1927 for the Military Aviation School.
 
 12 aircraft H.320 mod. 1926, Product: Aeroplanes Hanriot France
 45 aircraft H.320 mod. 1928, Product: Zmaj - Zemun Yugoslavia

Variants
 HD.32 - main production version for Aéronautique Militaire with Le Rhône 9C engine
 HD.320 - version with Salmson 9Ac engine (12 built + 45 Zmaj Zemun Yugoslavia)
 HD.321 - version with Clerget 9B engine (11 built, plus 4 converted from HD.32 and four converted from HD.14)

Specifications

See also

Notes

References
 
 
 Hagedorn, Dan; Antonio Luis Sapienza: Aircraft of the Chaco War, 1928-1935. Schiffer Publishing Co. Atglen, PA. 1996
 

1920s French military trainer aircraft
Hanriot aircraft
Biplanes
Single-engined tractor aircraft
Aircraft first flown in 1924